The Copa del Generalísimo 1958 Final was the 56th final of the King's Cup. The final was played at Estadio Chamartín in Madrid, on 29 June 1958, being won by Atlético de Bilbao, who beat Real Madrid 2–0.

Although both clubs remained among the regulars competing for trophies, they did not meet in another final again until the 2021–22 Supercopa de España, almost 64 years later.

Details

See also
El Viejo Clásico

References

1957
Copa
Athletic Bilbao matches
Real Madrid CF matches